Aspidoparia ukhrulensis is a species of cyprinid fish native to India and Myanmar.

References 

Danios
Fish described in 2001
Taxobox binomials not recognized by IUCN